Kluis is a municipality in the Vorpommern-Rügen district, in Mecklenburg-Vorpommern, Germany.

References

External links
Official website of Kluis